Reem or REEM may refer to:

People 
 Reem (given name) means a baby deer or gazelle in Arabic 
Reem (singer), Danish singer

Places 
 Al Reem Island, island 600 meters off the coast of Abu Dhabi island

Other 
Arabian sand gazelle, also known as the reem
Reem International Circuit, venue of Motorsports in Riyadh Saudi Arabia
 Re'em, a Jewish mythological creature
 REEM, humanoid robot built by PAL Robotics
 "Reem", a 2011 single by Joey Essex

See also 
 Ream (disambiguation)
 Reim (disambiguation)
 Rheem (disambiguation)
 Riem (name), a list of people with the given name or surname